My Isekai Life, short for , is a Japanese light novel series written by Shinkoshoto and illustrated by Huuka Kazabana. It began serialization online in October 2017 on the user-generated novel publishing website Shōsetsuka ni Narō. It was later acquired by SB Creative, who has released the series since May 2018 under their GA Novel label.

A manga adaptation with art by Ponjea has been serialized online since July 2018 via Square Enix's online manga magazine Manga UP!. The manga is licensed in North America by Square Enix. An anime television series adaptation by Revoroot aired from July to September 2022.

Plot
Whether at the office or at home, corporate drone Yuji Sano works all the time. So when his home PC flashes a message about him being summoned to another world, Yuji restarts his machine ... only to find that he's inadvertently accepted the summons! Now in a fantasy world far removed from paperwork and computers, Yuji has just one thing on his mind: waking up from what he thinks is a dream and getting back to the mountain of work he left behind! But this other world has other plans for Yuji, who quickly discovers his Monster Tamer character class allows him to befriend slimes! And thanks to their number, those slimes help him absorb so much magical knowledge that he gains a second character class in the blink of an eye! How will Yuji wield his power now that he's the greatest sage the realm has ever known?! And what about all that paperwork?!

Characters

Falling asleep as a salaryman but waking up in the world of a game he was playing as a novice Tamer. Despite his confusion he tamed a slime and immediately discovered the disused hut of a deceased sorcerer. He found that as the slimes read the sorcerers’ book collection he instantly gained all the skills and knowledge from the books and within minutes gained the title of Sage.

Media

Light novel
The series is written by Shinkoshoto and illustrated by Huuka Kazabana. Originally serialized online on Shōsetsuka ni Narō in October 2017, SB Creative published the first novel in print under their GA Novel label on May 15, 2018. As of September 2022, twelve volumes have been released.

Manga
A manga adaptation, illustrated by Ponjea, started serialization in Square Enix's Manga UP! website on July 29, 2018. The first tankōbon volume was released on September 13, 2018. As of February 2023, nineteen volumes have been released.

On March 13, 2021, Square Enix announced that they will begin publish the manga in English in December 2021. They later released the first volume in January 2022.

Anime
An anime television series adaptation by Revoroot was announced during the "GA Fes 2021" event livestream on January 31, 2021. It is directed by Keisuke Kojima, who also provides the character designs. Kiyotaka Suzuki is serving as the assistant director, with scripts written by Naohiro Fukushima, and music composed by Gin from Busted Rose. The series aired from July 4 to September 12, 2022, on AT-X, Tokyo MX, BS NTV, and BS Fuji, with the first two episodes airing back-to-back. The opening theme song is "Mujikaku no Tensai" by Non Stop Rabbit, while the ending theme song is "Gohan da yo! Dadadadan!!" by Hikaru Tohno, Mai Kanno, Haruna Mikawa, Erisa Kuon, Nichika Ōmori, and Miharu Hanai under the unit name Surachanzu△. Sentai Filmworks has licensed the series. Medialink also licensed the series in Asia-Pacific. At their Otakon panel in July 2022, Sentai Filmworks announced that the series will receive an English dub in August 2022.

The first promotional video was released on January 4, 2022. According to the director, Keisuke Kojima, all key frames in the video were illustrated with Clip Studio Ex.

Episode list

See also
 The Strongest Sage with the Weakest Crest—Another light novel series by the same author and illustrator

References

External links
 
 

2018 Japanese novels
2022 anime television series debuts
Adventure anime and manga
Anime and manga based on light novels
Gangan Comics manga
Isekai anime and manga
Isekai novels and light novels
Japanese webcomics
Light novels
Light novels first published online
Medialink
Revoroot
Sentai Filmworks
Shōnen manga
Shōsetsuka ni Narō
Webcomics in print